Philip S. Turner (born 20 February 1927) is a footballer who played as an inside forward in the Football League for Chester City, Carlisle United, Bradford Park Avenue, Scunthorpe United, Accrington Stanley (1891) and Winsford United.

References

1927 births
Possibly living people
People from Frodsham
Association football inside forwards
English footballers
Chester City F.C. players
Carlisle United F.C. players
Bradford (Park Avenue) A.F.C. players
Scunthorpe United F.C. players
Accrington Stanley F.C. (1891) players
Winsford United F.C. players
English Football League players
Sportspeople from Cheshire